Mortsel is a city and municipality close to the city of Antwerp located in the Belgian province of Antwerp. The municipality only comprises the city of Mortsel proper. In 2021, Mortsel had a total population of 26,170 people. The total area is 7.78 km².

Geography
The city consists of the areas Mortsel-Dorp, Oude-God and Luithagen. Mortsel is bordered by Antwerp (districts Wilrijk, Berchem and Deurne), Borsbeek, Boechout, Hove, and Edegem.

History
Mortsel was the scene for one of the major collateral damage tragedies of World War II. On 5 April 1943, the Minerva car factory, then used to repair Luftwaffe planes, was the target of a bombing raid by the USAAF. Most bombs missed the target and hit a residential area instead, resulting in the deaths of 936 civilians, including 209 children, exceeding the civilian death toll of the Guernica raid which modern estimates put at 400.

The last V2 launched against Antwerp also fell in Mortsel, killing 27 people, on 27 March 1945.

Economy
The headquarters of Agfa-Gevaert are situated in Mortsel.

Notable people

 Alex Agnew, stand-up comedian
 Luc Brewaeys, (born in Mortsel in 1959), composer, conductor, pianist and recording producer
 Bart De Wever, politician
 Timo Descamps, actor
 Koen Lenaerts, President of the European Court of Justice
 Clem Schouwenaars (b. Mortsel, 1932–1993), writer
 Daniel Dardha, chess player
 Tamino, musician
 Luc Tuymans, painter
 Jos Vandeloo, writer

See also the :Category:People from Mortsel.

See also
Crossing the Lines

References

External links

  

 
Municipalities of Antwerp Province
Populated places in Antwerp Province